Sun Kudumbam Viruthugal for Best Actress is an award given as part of its annual Sun Kudumbam Viruthugal for TV serials to recognize an actress who has delivered an outstanding performance in a leading role.

The award was first awarded in 2010 under the title Sun Kudumbam Viruthugal for Best Actress. Serial actress Abitha is so far the first winner to have won an award in this category 2 times, for her role Archana in Thirumathi Selvam.

List of winners

2010

2012

2014

2018

2019

2022

See also
 Sun Kudumbam Viruthugal 
 Vijay Television Awards

References

External links
 Sun Kudumbam Viruthugal 

Sun Kudumbam Viruthugal
Awards for actresses